Eunice F. Foster is an American agronomist known for her work on nitrogen cycling and legumes. She was named a fellow of the American Association for the Advancement of Science.

Education 
Foster was the first member of her family to attend college.  She received a B.S. in elementary education from Otterbein College, and went on to teach for four years before going to Ohio State University where she received an M.S. in agronomy from Ohio State University. She earned a Ph.D. in crop physiology from the University of Arkansas. In 1982, after earning her Ph.D, she moved to Michigan State University where, as of 2022, she is a professor.

Honors and awards 
In 2021 Foster was elected as fellow of the American Association for the Advancement of Science.

References

External links

Living people
Otterbein University alumni
Ohio State University alumni
University of Arkansas alumni
Fellows of the American Association for the Advancement of Science
Year of birth missing (living people)